Lewis Grant may refer to:
Lewis Grant (colonial administrator), British colonial administrator
Lewis A. Grant, American general

See also
Lewis Grant-Ogilvy, 5th Earl of Seafield